AT&T Merlin is a corporate telephone system by American Telephone and Telegraph (AT&T) that was introduced in late 1983, when it was branded American Bell Merlin. After the breakup of AT&T in 1984, it was rebranded and later also supplied by Lucent and Avaya.

The system was designed at the beginning of the 1980s prior to the Bell System Divestiture as a modern electronic replacement for the dated electromechanical 1A2 Key System. Earlier Bell attempts at an electronic key system, such as Horizon and Dimension, were not as successful as were the much larger systems; in fact, Dimension was a PBX. The Merlin was the first small electronic system, replacing the Com Key 416. The Merlin system was originally sold in two-line, six-telephone (206); four-line, 10-telephone (410); and eight-line, 20-telephone (820) configurations. Later, there was a further 10-line, 30-telephone configuration, and with the addition of an expansion key service unit (KSU) the system could accommodate up to 30 lines and 70 telephones available (1030 and 3070 respectively). Later, the Merlin Plus created a system initially configured for four lines and 10 phone extensions with built in Feature Modules previously purchased as a separate module on the original 206, 410, 820, and 1030 control units. Merlin Plus was expandable to up to eight lines and up to 20 phone extensions.

For larger installations, AT&T System 25 PBX was an advanced digital switching system that integrates voice and data communications. It was designed to meet the business communications needs of customers in the 30 to 150 station range. And it not only provided the features of a state-of-the-art private branch exchange (PBX), but also allowed data to be switched point-to-point without first being converted to analog format. This capability was used to set up connections between data terminals, word processors, personal computers, and host computers. The system provided 256 ports to support the following:

 115 simultaneous two-party conversations
 Traffic Handling Capacity of 4140 CCS (Trunking Limited)
 Busy Hour Call Capacity of 2500 calls (DTMF Register Limited)
 Up to 104 trunk ports including Central Office (CO), DID, Tie, Foreign Exchange (FX), Wide Area Telecommunications Service (WATS), and 800 Service
 An Auxiliary Trunk interface for paging and dictation systems
 Up to 240 ports that support a combination of the following:
 Up to 200 ports for voice terminals and auxiliary feature port equipment.
 Up to 104 data ports providing RS-232 connections to data terminals, personal or multiport computer.

Merlin systems were administratively programmed and customized using special dial codes and button presses through the phone connected to extension port 10 with the phone's T/P switch moved to the P position. Unlike the smaller Merlin systems, System 25 was programmed using a System Administration Terminal (SAT). The SAT was a dedicated, password-protected computer terminal continuously connected to the RS232 serial port to the PBX. The default password was systemx5.

Predecessors
The 1A2 Key Telephone System and later ComKey series (4-16, 7-18, 14-34) had the following problems which the Merlin system sought to solve with a microprocessor design:
 Complex mechanical line switches in every telephone
 Each individual line pair plus control and lamp pairs must be run to each individual telephone, making for expensive on-premises wiring
 Telephones were connected to one another using labor intensive point to point wiring
 Control units consisted of many separate components including a power supply, line and feature module carrier, and punch blocks
 Compared to more modern designs emerging in the 1970s, manufacturing and maintaining the system became very expensive, especially by the 1980s
 Basic features were present such as line switching, intercom, and hold but there was little possibility for addition of modern features

History
The Merlin system fixed these problems by:
 Having line switching done completely electronically at the control unit (Horizon was the first to do so) 
 Using 4-pair wiring (one pair for control signals, two pairs for two independent analog voice paths, and one pair for -48V power and ground). The Horizon system was the first design attempt of a "skinny cable" key system in the world and was introduced in the late 1970s with similar control unit switching but didn’t gain similar popularity however it did provide the foundation of the system employed on Merlin
 An important advance in handset design was the use of printed circuit boards and automated assembly which were economical to produce. Horizon, Dimension and Merlin were leaders in the use of PCB based handsets.  
 Fully electronic, all inclusive, one piece control unit
 Slots for feature modules made possible optional extra price features such as Speed Dialing, Automatic Line Selection, and Redial
 The Merlin telephones were also backwards compatible to the higher end enterprise systems, such as then System 75 and System 85 systems, then later Definity system, now called Communication Manager platforms.

Merlin phones were offered in a variety of high-gloss plastic color choices of black, midnight blue, charcoal gray, white, chocolate brown, burgundy, and cinnabar (red).  For an example of model numbers including color codes, the 7303H01D 10-Button Membrane Voice Terminal were available as: 7303H01D-03 (BLACK) 105217509, 7303H01D-58 (WHITE) 105217517, 7303HO1D-104 (BROWN) 105217525, 7303H01D-139 (GRAY) 105217533, 7303H01D-142 (MID BLUE) 105214541, 7303H01D-143 (BURGUNDY) 105217558, 7303H01D-144 (CINNABAR) 105217566,  and 7303H01D-215 (MISTY) 105217608.

According to Steve Mak, an engineer who worked in the Merlin division (codenamed Antelope) at Bell Labs/Western Electric, "Black was 80% of total phones sold and much harder to maintain quality because of the high gloss defects actually showed up more pronounced than the other colors. At its peak, we were producing as much as 5,000 phones a day at our Shreveport manufacturing facility." When the membrane phone series was replaced with the new SP- and BIS- phone series, these color choices were all eliminated except black.

The original Merlin was replaced with the Merlin Plus system in the late 1980s, using circuit cards to be expandable to 8 lines and 20 telephones, much like the original 820 model.  The original Merlin Plus was dubbed the 820d. It is identical in features to the earlier Merlin, the 820, with the Feature Package 2 cartridge installed. Following the 820d was the 820d2. The 820d2 included the previous features as the 820d but featured an Automatic System Access (ASA) processor coupled with a voice synthesis capabilities and a Busy Buster.  The ASA processor provided users with call forwarding, direct extension dial, and system answer capabilities.  The busy buster allowed users to have the 820d2 automatically retry a busy number every minute for up to 10 minutes and notify the user when the call was connected.  Both the ASA and Busy Buster required a their own voice terminal port to function.   In the early 1990s, the Merlin II and Merlin Legend debuted with even more features and expandability, and new MLX telephones, but the system was also backwards compatible with the original Merlin telephones.

In 1999, Lucent Technologies introduced the Merlin Magix as the replacement for the Merlin Legend. The Magix's carrier was metal and, as such, modules were not encased inside plastic shells as they were with the Legend. The Merlin Magix supports new 4400 series digital telephones as well as older MLX telephones, but it does not support the old ATL series telephones. One important item with the conversion of Legend to Magix, is how MLX telephones use 2-pair wiring and the newer Magix/4400 series phones only use a single (1) pair. This made the Magix easier to install and more competitive in the marketplace, as most other digital PBX systems only use a single (1) pair to each station/telephone.

Due to declining sales and the introduction of the IP Office product line, Avaya retired the Magix on April 1, 2006.

Despite being over two decades old, the Merlin's modern electronic features and legendary Bell System era quality and durability still make the classic Merlins very popular telephone systems with small businesses.
Merlin sets shared over 50 pieces of plastic with digital telephones of the Dimension PBX as well as membrane switch technology (a first use in AT&T), reducing product introduction costs in 1983.

"Skinny cable" revolution
The 1A2 phone system was the only multi-line telephone system solution for many decades, but it also had feature limitations, complex cable management, and high maintenance cost for adds, moves, or changes. Each 1A2 multi-line telephone required at least a 25-pair Category 3 cable necessary for line access and button/light controls, with some receptionist telephones requiring a 50-pair or 100-pair connection for one attendant console.

The Merlin system (and its predecessor the AT&T Horizon system) was designed to eliminate the complexities of 1A2, including the difficult and expensive 25-pair cable. Engineers were able to utilize electronic switching in the control unit (KSU) instead of switching in the phone itself so all the Merlin system telephones were more like mainframe dumb terminals (AT&T actually called them voice terminals instead of “phones”), reducing telephone cost and simplifying troubleshooting.

The Merlin system introduced a new wiring design of eight wires (four-pair) that allowed the system to deliver two voice paths to each desk phone so a user on an active telephone call could still receive a paging announcement on their phone’s desk speaker simultaneously.  AT&T described the signaling channel on the data pair as “analog multi-line telephone protocol (40 kbps)” but no further details were made available about the protocol.

Attached here is the pin-out diagram of the new "skinny cable", only requiring 4-pair Category 3 cable, to each telephone set while providing the same multiline functionality of 1A2 and more.  It uses the RJ45 connector to connect each phone (voice terminal) to its associated extension jack on the Merlin control unit (KSU).

For sites with previously installed 1A2 systems,  an adapter was available that could simply be connected to the Amphenol connector commonly used by 1A2 telephones. It would convert one 1A2 phone extension's connection cable to up to six RJ45 connections for AT&T Merlin phone extensions without the need for rewiring.

Merlin 206, 410, 820 cartridge information

Cartridge Type I
Feature Package 1 (Available for use in Classic Merlin 206, 410 only):
5-party conference calling
Ringer options
Prevents outgoing calls on individual phones
Privacy
Automatic outside and intercom dialing
Last number redial, automatic line selection, do-not-disturb
On-hook dialing, call transfer, hold reminder, group listening

Feature Package II (Included same features as Feature Package I plus the following)
Personal and system wide 3 digit speed dialing
Personalized Ringing
Call pickup
Group paging zones

Cartridge Type II
Music On Hold
Allows a music source to be connected to the KSU which is heard by a caller on hold

Music On Hold/Paging
Allows a music source to be connected to the KSU which is heard by a caller on hold
Provides a paging system connection and music on hold to be used as background music while no pages are being made.

Cartridge Type III
Power Failure/Extra Alert
Provides two RJ-11 jacks for standard touch-tone or rotary phone use in case of power failure.
Extra Alert jack for external notification device.

Merlin device add-on accessories

Data Collector
Used only with the Merlin Plus system for logging calls or configuration to a printer.  The Merlin Plus system Data Collector uses information from the Call Report and System Feature Report features and transmits the material from the Merlin Plus system to a printer or to a PC with a standard RS232-C, 1200 baud, serial interface. You can connect the data collector to an available voice terminal jack on the control unit.

The data collector can hold up to one full page of printout, 60 lines of 80 characters each. The collector disregards any material over the one page limit.

The Merlin Plus system is set to have the data collector and the printer connected to voice terminal jack 19, but the administrator can connect the data collector and the printer to any other voice terminal jack in the system, except jack 10.

Door phone controller (DAC-1Z)
A door phone controller (DAC-1Z) can be connected to your Merlin Plus system to allow employees to answer calls made from a business entrance.

It is connected directly to a CO line port on the Merlin Plus control unit. Callers using the door phone can press a button at the building entrance to ring a telephone in your Merlin Plus system. An auxiliary alert device (such as a doorbell, chime, or tone generator) can be connected to the door phone controller so that it will ring when the door phone button is pushed.

An optional electric strike plate release can be obtained for door operation to permit the caller to unlock the door by entering a preset code on the door phone keypad. The electric strike plate can also provide an alarm that sounds when the door is opened by unauthorized means or is not closed within a certain amount of time.

Although the door phone controller can be configured to connect to either a Central Office (CO) port or a station port, it is recommended that only the CO port connection be used. The CO port to which the door phone controller is connected can be dedicated to the door phone controller, or shared by a CO line and the door phone controller.

General Purpose Adapter (GPA)
Because the Merlin system was designed to support only Merlin phones, the General Purpose Adapter allows for the connection of non-Merlin equipment such as cordless phones and answering machines.  The General Purpose Adapter is a small box about the size of two packs of playing cards and connects through the Other Port on the underside of most Merlin voice terminals, providing power and voice connectivity in one proprietary Other cable.  The connected analog device shares the extension and call of the Merlin phone it is connected with.

Basic Telephone and Modem Interface (BTMI-2)
Connecting a standard analog telephone to the proprietary Merlin system requires an external adapter unit called a Basic Telephone and Modem Interface.  This device is connected to an available port normally used for a proprietary Merlin phone extension is used.  There is no limit to the number of BTMI units can be connected to a Merlin system, as long as an extension port is available for each unit.  Any standard analog telephone device, such as a cordless phone or analog computer modem, can be connected to the BTMI's phone port.  Through Merlin system programming, the order of lines selected for outgoing calls can be set for when the analog user dials 9 to make an external call.  Other Merlin telephones can be called by simply dialing the Merlin extension number from the analog phone.  Call waiting is available for the analog user, although can be disabled for computer modem use by moving the BTMI-2 mode selector switch to the Data setting.  System features such as call hold, transferring, last number redial and saved number redial are available through the use of special DTMF codes.  Message Waiting lamp illumination is compatible for analog phones that are equipped with that feature.

References

 AT&T Sourcebook Catalog 1992, 1993, 1995.
 Merlin Installation, Programming & User Guides MERLIN 410: All Documents
 eOpinions.com on the Merlin Magix discontinuation
 Definity Enterprise Communications Server and System 75 and System 85 Terminals and Adjuncts Reference Manual December 1999, support.avaya.com
 Overview Merlin Phone Systems v5 
 AT&T Merlin Plus Installation Manual 1987.

Avaya
Telephony equipment